Ohio Grove Township is located in Mercer County, Illinois. As of the 2010 census, its population was 279 and it contained 116 housing units.  Ohio Grove Township changed its name from Ohio sometime after 1921.

Geography

Demographics

References

External links
City-data.com
Illinois State Archives

Townships in Mercer County, Illinois
Townships in Illinois